The 29th Young Artist Awards ceremony, presented by the Young Artist Association, honored excellence of young performers under the age of 21 in the fields of film, television and theatre for the year 2007, and took place on March 30, 2008 at the Sportsmen's Lodge in Studio City, Los Angeles, California.

The big winner that year was Bridge to Terabithia, with one of the rare "sweeps" in the history of the Young Artist Awards.  The film won all categories for which it was nominated, taking a total of five awards – "Best 'Fantasy' Family Feature Film", "Best Leading Young Actor in a Feature Film" for Josh Hutcherson, "Best Leading Young Actress in a Feature Film" for AnnaSophia Robb, "Best Young Actress Age 10 and Under in a Feature Film" for Bailee Madison, and "Best Young Ensemble in a Feature Film" for the entire young cast.

Established in 1978 by long-standing Hollywood Foreign Press Association member, Maureen Dragone, the Young Artist Association was the first organization to establish an awards ceremony specifically set to recognize and award the contributions of performers under the age of 21 in the fields of film, television, theater and music.

Categories
★ Bold indicates the winner in each category.

Best Performance in a Feature Film

Best Performance in a Feature Film – Leading Young Actor
★ Josh Hutcherson – Bridge to Terabithia – Buena Vista Pictures
 Alex Etel – The Water Horse: Legend of the Deep – Columbia Pictures
 Miles Heizer – Rails & Ties – Warner Brothers
 Freddie Highmore – August Rush – Warner Brothers
 Jacob Kogan – Joshua – Fox Searchlight Pictures
 Logan Lerman – 3:10 to Yuma – Lionsgate
 Zach Mills – Mr. Magorium's Wonder Emporium – 20th Century Fox
 Alex Neuberger – Underdog – Buena Vista Pictures
 Chris O'Neil – The Last Mimzy – New Line Cinema
 Alejandro Polanco – Chop Shop – Koch Lober Films

Best Performance in a Feature Film – Leading Young Actress
★ AnnaSophia Robb – Bridge to Terabithia – Buena Vista Pictures
 Gracie Bednarczyk – Grace Is Gone – The Weinstein Company
 Abigail Breslin – No Reservations – Warner Brothers
 Isamar Gonzales – Chop Shop – Koch Lober Films
 Kay Panabaker – Moondance Alexander – 20th Century Fox
 Dakota Blue Richards – The Golden Compass – New Line Cinema
 Emma Roberts – Nancy Drew – Warner Brothers
 Saoirse Ronan – Atonement – Focus Features

Best Performance in a Feature Film – Supporting Young Actor (Fantasy or Drama)
★ Leon G. Thomas III – August Rush – Warner Brothers
 Alex Ferris – The Invisible – Buena Vista Pictures
 Dillon Freasier – There Will Be Blood – Paramount Pictures
 Soren Fulton – South of Pico – Snails Pace Productions
 Jordan Garrett – Death Sentence – 20th Century Fox
 Devon Gearhart – Canvas – Screen Media Films
 Bailey Hughes – Good Time Max – Rabbit Bandini Productions
 Denzel Whitaker – The Great Debaters – MGM

Best Performance in a Feature Film – Supporting Young Actor (Comedy or Musical)
★ Zachary Gordon – Georgia Rule – Universal Pictures
 Max Baldry – Mr. Bean's Holiday – Universal Pictures
 Jimmy Bennett – Evan Almighty – Universal Pictures
 Dylan McLaughlin – Georgia Rule – Universal Pictures
 Graham Phillips – Evan Almighty – Universal Pictures
 Ed Sanders – Sweeney Todd: The Demon Barber of Fleet Street – Paramount Pictures

Best Performance in a Feature Film – Supporting Young Actress
★ Jasmine Jessica Anthony – 1408 – MGM
 Courtney Taylor Burness – Premonition – MGM
 Hannah Lochner – Firehouse Dog – 20th Century Fox
 Taylor Momsen – Underdog – Buena Vista Pictures
 Jamia Simone Nash – August Rush – Warner Brothers
 Keke Palmer – Cleaner – Screen Gems
 Kristen Stewart – Into the Wild – Paramount Vantage

Best Performance in a Feature Film – Young Actor Ten and Under
★ Micah Berry – Things We Lost in the Fire – Paramount Pictures
 Nicholas Art – The Nanny Diaries – MGM
 Jackson Bond – The Invasion – Warner Brothers
 Bobby Coleman – Martian Child – New Line Cinema
 Nathan Gamble – The Mist – MGM
 Samuel Garland – The Reaping – Warner Brothers
 Dakota Goyo – Resurrecting the Champ – Yari Film Group
 Jeremy Karson – Music & Lyrics – Warner Brothers
 Austin Williams – Michael Clayton – Warner Brothers

Best Performance in a Feature Film – Young Actress Ten and Under
★ Bailee Madison – Bridge to Terabithia – Buena Vista Pictures
 Rachel Covey – Enchanted – Walt Disney Pictures
 Megan McKinnon – Project Grey – IndustryWorks
 Madison Pettis – The Game Plan – Buena Vista Pictures
 Willow Smith – I Am Legend – Warner Brothers
 Rhiannon Leigh Wryn – The Last Mimzy – New Line Cinema

Best Performance in a Feature Film – Young Ensemble Cast
★ Bridge to Terabithia – Buena Vista PicturesJosh Hutcherson, AnnaSophia Robb, Bailee Madison, Cameron Wakefield, Isabelle Rose Kircher, Lauren Clinton, Elliot Lawless, Carly Owen, Devon Wood, Emma Fenton and Grace Brannigan  Daddy Day Camp – TriStar Pictures
Spencir Bridges, Dallin Boyce, Telise Galanis, Tad D'Agostino, Talon G. Ackerman, Taggart Hurtubise, Molly Jepson, Tyger Rawlings, Zachary Allen and Sean Patrick Flaherty
  The Last Mimzy – New Line Cinema
Chris O'Neil, Rhiannon Leigh Wryn, Marc Musso, Megan McKinnon and Nicole Munoz
  Nancy Drew – Warner Brothers
Emma Roberts, Josh Flitter, Amy Bruckner and Kay Panabaker

Best Performance in an International Feature Film
Best Performance in an International Feature Film – Leading Young Performer
★ Adrian Alonso (Mexico) – La Misma Luna (Under the Same Moon) – Fox Searchlight Noah Burnett (Canada) – Breakfast with Scot – Capri Films
 Louis Dussol (Switzerland) – 1 Journée (That Day) – Vega Film
 Zekeria Ebrahimi (Afghanistan) – The Kite Runner – Paramount Vantage
 Michel Joelsas (Brazil) – O Ano em que Meus Pais Saíram de Férias (The Year My Parents Went on Vacation) – City Lights Pictures
 Joel Lok (Australia) – The Home Song Stories – Dendy Films
 Ahmad Khan Mahmidzada (Afghanistan) – The Kite Runner – Paramount Vantage
 Bertille Noël-Bruneau (France) – Le Renard et l'Enfant (The Fox and the Child) – Picturehouse Entertainment
 Jimi Blue Ochsenknecht (Germany) –  (The Wild Soccer Bunch 4) – Buena Vista International
 Armin Omerovic (Croatia) – Armin – Maxima Film
 Roger Príncep (Spain) – The Orphanage – Picturehouse Entertainment
 Thomas Sangster (England) – The Last Legion – The Weinstein Company
 Michelle von Treuberg (Germany) – Die Wilden Hühner und die Liebe (Wild Chicks in Love) – Constantin Film

Best Performance in a Short Film
Best Performance in a Short Film – Young Actor
★ Remy Thorne – Bad – Vincenzo Giammanco (Director) Joseph Castanon – Little Wings – Journey Blue Films
 Hunter Gomez – The Blacksmith and the Carpenter – Scottsdale Community College
 Dominic Scott Kay – Grampa's Cabin – Red Balloon Entertainment
 Kendall McCulty – Conflation – Stéphanie Joalland (Director)
 Benjamin B. Smith – Heart Attack – Christi Olson (Director)
 Connor Stanhope – The Velveteen Rabbit – Denise Quesnel (Director)

Best Performance in a Short Film – Young Actress
★ Mia Ford – Far Sighted – Filmmakers Alliance Taylor Lipman – The Infamous Buddy Blade – Delaware Coalition Films
 Kendra McCulty – Conflation – Stéphanie Joalland (Director)
 Diandra Newlin – The Bench – Revolocity
 Car’ynn Sims – The Infamous Buddy Blade – Delaware Coalition Films

Best Performance in a TV Movie, Miniseries or Special
Best Performance in a TV Movie, Miniseries or Special – Leading Young Actor
★ Chevez Ezaneh – Bury My Heart at Wounded Knee – HBO Devon Bostick – The Altar Boy Gang – CBC
 Cody Linley – The Haunting Hour: Don't Think About It – Universal
 Dylan McLaughlin – You've Got a Friend – Hallmark Channel
 Jansen Panettiere – The Last Day of Summer – Nickelodeon
 Graham Phillips – Ben 10: Race Against Time – Cartoon Network
 Jimmy "Jax" Pinchak – All I Want for Christmas – Hallmark Channel
 Devon Werkheiser – Shredderman Rules – Nickelodeon

Best Performance in a TV Movie, Miniseries or Special – Leading Young Actress
★ Danielle Chuchran – Saving Sarah Cain – Lifetime Holliston Coleman – Love's Unending Legacy – Hallmark Channel
 Jodelle Ferland – Pictures of Hollis Woods – Hallmark Hall of Fame
 Marisa Guterman – Shredderman Rules – Nickelodeon
 Regan Jewitt – Emotional Arithmetic – CBS
 Abigail Mason – Saving Sarah Cain – Lifetime
 Emily Osment – The Haunting Hour: Don't Think About It – Universal
 Emanuela Szumilas – Greatest Show Ever – Popoosa Productions
 Niamh Wilson – They Come Back – Lifetime

Best Performance in a TV Movie, Miniseries or Special – Supporting Young Actor
★ Zack Shada – Jane Doe: Ties That Bind – Hallmark Channel Ridge Canipe – Pictures of Hollis Woods – Hallmark Hall of Fame
 Timmy Deters – Love's Unfolding Dream – Hallmark Channel
 Chase Ellison – You've Got a Friend – Hallmark Channel
 Jon Kent Ethridge – The Last Day of Summer – Nickelodeon
 Jordan Garrett – By Appointment Only – American Cinema International
 Tyler Patrick Jones – Ben 10: Race Against Time – Cartoon Network
 Cody Benjamin Lee – The Last Day of Summer – Nickelodeon
 Braeden Lemasters – Love's Unending Legacy – Hallmark Channel
 Zach Mills – The Valley of Light – CBS
 Jake D. Smith – Tin Man – Sci-Fi Channel
 Darian Weiss  – Christmas Miracle at Sage Creek – American World Pictures

Best Performance in a TV Movie, Miniseries or Special – Supporting Young Actress
★ Bailee Madison – The Last Day of Summer – Nickelodeon Saige Ryan Campbell – All I Want for Christmas – Hallmark Channel
 Jennette McCurdy – The Last Day of Summer – Nickelodeon
 Mary Matilyn Mouser – A Stranger's Heart – Hallmark Channel
 Haley Ramm – Ben 10: Race Against Time – Cartoon Network

Best Performance in a TV Series
Best Performance in a TV Series – Leading Young Actor
★ Jamie Johnston – Degrassi: The Next Generation – CTV Keir Gilchrist – The Winner – FOX
 Noah Gray-Cabey – Heroes – NBC
 Carter Jenkins – Viva Laughlin – CBS
 Angus T. Jones – Two and a Half Men – CBS
 Sean Keenan – Lockie Leonard – VOOM HD
 Kyle Massey – Cory in the House – Disney Channel
 Devon Werkheiser – Ned's Declassified School Survival Guide – Nickelodeon
 Tyler James Williams – Everybody Hates Chris – CBS

Best Performance in a TV Series – Leading Young Actress
★ Miley Cyrus – Hannah Montana – Disney Channel Rhyon Brown – Lincoln Heights – ABC Family
 Miranda Cosgrove – iCarly – Nickelodeon
 Emma Roberts – Unfabulous – Nickelodeon
 Jamie Lynn Spears – Zoey 101 – Nickelodeon

Best Performance in a TV Series – Supporting Young Actor
★ Slade Pearce – October Road – ABC Dean Collins – The War at Home FOX
 Jason Dolley – Cory in the House – Disney Channel
 Alexander Gould – Weeds – Showtime
 Mitch Holleman – Reba – CW
 Mark Indelicato – Ugly Betty – ABC
 Nathan Kress – iCarly – Nickelodeon
 Daniel Magder – Life with Derek – Disney Channel
 Vincent Martella – Everybody Hates Chris – CBS
 Aidan Mitchell – The Riches – FX

Best Performance in a TV Series – Supporting Young Actress
★ Adair Tishler – Heroes – NBC Taylor Atelian – According to Jim – ABC
 Malese Jow – Unfabulous – Nickelodeon
 Tinashe Kachingwe – Out of Jimmy's Head – Cartoon Network
 Jennette McCurdy – iCarly – Nickelodeon
 Mary Matilyn Mouser – Life Is Wild – CW

Best Performance in a TV Series – Young Actor Age Ten or Younger
★ Dylan Minnette – Saving Grace – TNT Lorenzo Brino – 7th Heaven – CW
 Nikolas Brino – 7th Heaven – CW
 Joseph Castanon – I Hate My 30's – VH1
 Field Cate – Pushing Daisies – ABC
 Khamani Griffin – All of Us – CW
 Trevor Gagnon – The New Adventures of Old Christine – CBS

Best Performance in a TV series – Guest Starring Young Actor
★ Chandler Canterbury – Criminal Minds (ep: "In Birth and Death") – CBS Cameron Bright – The 4400 (ep: "Wrath of Graham") – USA Network
 Nicholas Elia – Supernatural – (ep: "The Kids are Alright") – CW
 Dylan Everett – The Dresden Files (ep: "Birds of a Feather") – Sci-Fi Channel
 Colin Ford – Journeyman (ep: "Blowback") – NBC
 Soren Fulton – Bones (ep: "The Priest in the Churchyard") – FOX
 Dominic Scott Kay – Navy NCIS (ep: "Lost & Found") – CBS
 Quinn Lord – Smallville (ep: "Phantom") – CW
 Justin Martin – Cold Case (ep: "It Takes a Village") – CBS
 Dylan Patton – Cold Case (ep: "Blackout") – CBS
 Colby Paul – Pushing Daisies (ep: "Corpsicle") – ABC
 Cole Petersen – CSI: Miami (ep: "Stand Your Ground") – CBS
 Remy Thorne – Criminal Minds (ep: "Revelations") – CBS

Best Performance in a TV series – Guest Starring Young Actress
★ Jasmine Jessica Anthony – Ugly Betty (ep: "Something Wicked This Way Comes") – ABC Jenna Boyd – Ghost Whisperer (ep: "Children of Ghosts") – CW
 Darcy Rose Byrnes – Cold Case (ep: "A Dollar, A Dream") – CBS
 Conchita Campbell – Supernatural (ep: "Playthings") – CW
 Bailee Madison – House (ep: "Act Your Age") – NBC
 Ashlyn Sanchez – Without a Trace (ep: "Desert Springs") – TNT
 Bella Thorne – The O.C. (ep: "The Case of the Franks") – FOX

Best Performance in a TV series – Recurring Young Actor
★ Connor Price – The Dead Zone – USA Network Jake Cherry – Desperate Housewives – ABC
 Marc Donato – Degrassi: The Next Generation – CTV
 Caden Michael Gray – Out of Jimmy's Head – Cartoon Network
 Mick Hazen – As the World Turns – CBS
 Dominic Janes – ER – NBC
 Ty Panitz – Bones – FOX
 K'Sun Ray – Smith – CBS
 Will Shadley – Dirty Sexy Money – ABC
 Cainan Wiebe – Sanctuary – Sci-Fi Channel
 Calum Worthy – Psych – USA Network

Best Performance in a TV series – Recurring Young Actress
★ Erin Sanders – Zoey 101 – Nickelodeon Kristen Alderson – One Life to Live – ABC
 Rachel G. Fox – Desperate Housewives – ABC
 Chloe Greenfield – ER – NBC
 Danielle Hanratty – The Unit – CBC
 Sammi Hanratty – The Suite Life of Zack & Cody – Disney Channel
 Chloë Grace Moretz – Dirty Sexy Money – ABC
 Ryan Newman – Hannah Montana – Disney Channel
 Christina Robinson – Dexter – Showtime
 Darcy Rose Byrnes – The Young and the Restless – CBS
 Christian Serratos – Ned's Declassified School Survival Guide – Nickelodeon
 Alyson Stoner – The Suite Life of Zack & Cody – Disney Channel
 Keaton & Kylie Rae Tyndall – Big Love – HBO

Best Young Ensemble Performance in a TV Series
★ Out of Jimmy's Head – Cartoon Network Jon Kent Ethridge, Dominic Janes, Terrence Hardy, Jr., Caden Michael Gray, Austin Rogers, Tinashe Kachingwe, Jonina Gable, Nolan Gould, Katelin Petersen and Nicole Smolen Hannah Montana – Disney Channel
Miley Cyrus, Emily Osment, Mitchel Musso, Moisés Arias and Cody Linley
 The Naked Brothers Band – Nickelodeon
Alex Wolff, Nat Wolff, Allie DiMeco, Thomas Batuello, David Levi, Qaasim Middleton and Cooper Pillot
 Unfabulous – Nickelodeon
Jordan Calloway, Bianca Collins, Dustin Ingram, Malese Jow, Mary Lou, Emma Roberts and Chelsea Tavares 
 Wizards of Waverly Place – Disney Channel
Selena Gomez, David Henrie, Jennifer Stone and Jake T. Austin
 Zoey 101 – Nickelodeon
Jamie Lynn Spears, Paul Butcher, Sean Flynn, Victoria Justice, Christopher Massey, Erin Sanders and Matthew Underwood

Best Performance in a Voice-Over Role
Best Performance in a Voice-Over Role – Young Actor
★ Paul Butcher – Meet the Robinsons – Walt Disney Feature Animation Marc Donato – The Future Is Wild – Discovery Kids
 Jordan Fry – Meet the Robinsons – Walt Disney Feature Animation
 Trevor Gagnon – Fly Me to the Moon – nWave Pictures
 Jake D. Smith – Tom and Jerry Tales – The CW 4 Kids

Best Performance in a Voice-Over Role – Young Actress
★ Tajja Isen – Super Why! – PBS Chloë Grace Moretz – My Friends Tigger & Pooh – Walt Disney
 Grace Rolek – Lou and Lou: Safety Patrol – Disney Channel

Best Family Entertainment
Best Family Television Movie or Special
★ You've Got a Friend – Hallmark ChannelHigh School Musical – Disney Channel
The Last Day of Summer – Nickelodeon
The Naked Brothers Band: The Movie – Nickelodeon

Best Family Television Series
★ Hannah Montana – Disney ChannelLife Is Wild – CW
The Naked Brothers Band – Nickelodeon
Ned's Declassified School Survival Guide – Nickelodeon
Out of Jimmy's Head – Cartoon Network
The Winner – FOX
Zoey 101 – Nickelodeon

Best Family Television Reality Show, Game Show or Documentary
★ Are You Smarter than a 5th Grader? – FOXEndurance – Discovery Kids
Kid Nation – CBS
My Life as a Child – TLC
Who Cares About Girls? – Oxygen

Best Short Film Starring Youth
★ Bad – Vincenzo Giammanco (Director)The Bench – Revolocity
The Black Smith and the Carpenter – Scottsdale Community College
The Don of Virgil Junior High – Rising Nile Productions
Far Sighted – Filmmakers Alliance
The Infamous Buddy Blade – Delaware Coalition Films
The Velveteen Rabbit – Denise Quesnel (Director)

Best International Feature Film
★ La Misma Luna (Under the Same Moon) – MexicoBreakfast with Scot – Canada
 (The Wild Soccer Bunch 4) – Germany
Le Renard et l'Enfant (The Fox and The Child) – France
O Ano em que Meus Pais Saíram de Férias (The Year My Parents Went on Vacation) – Brazil

Best Family Feature Film (Animation)
★ Ratatouille – Walt Disney StudiosBee Movie – DreamWorks SKG
Meet the Robinsons – Walt Disney Animation
Surf's Up – Sony Pictures Animation

Best Family Feature Film (Fantasy or Musical)
★ Bridge to Terabithia – Walden MediaAlvin and the Chipmunks – 20th Century Fox
The Golden Compass – New Line Cinema
Underdog – Walt Disney Pictures
The Water Horse: Legend of the Deep – Columbia Pictures

Best Family Feature Film (Comedy or Drama)
★ August Rush – Warner BrothersEvan Almighty – Universal Pictures
Firehouse Dog – 20th Century Fox
Hairspray – New Line Cinema
The Last Mimzy – New Line Cinema
Martian Child – New Line Cinema
Nancy Drew – Warner Brothers

Special awards
Outstanding Young Performance in Live Theatre
★ Sara Niemietz as "Patrice" in 13 – Mark Taper Forum, Los AngelesFormer Child Star – Life Achievement Award
★ Jim Turner – Kung Fu

Outstanding Young Performer in a Foreign Film
★ Vlad Vyuzhanin – Fatherland or Death – Russia

Social Relations of Knowledge Institute Award
★ Nova – PBS

References

External links
 Official site

Young Artist Awards ceremonies
2007 film awards
2007 television awards
2008 in American cinema
2008 in American television
2008 in California